The Central Railroad of New Jersey Freight Station in Scranton, Pennsylvania, United States, was the western terminus of the Central Railroad of New Jersey line, 192 miles (309 km) from its base of operations in Jersey City, New Jersey. It is located on West Lackawanna Avenue, over the Lackawanna River from downtown Scranton, near Steamtown National Historic Site. It is to be distinguished from the other legacy Scranton station, Delaware, Lackawanna & Western Scranton Station, where service persisted to January 6, 1970. Yet additional passenger train stations in Scranton were those of the Delaware and Hudson Railway and the Erie Railroad.

Built in 1891 in a Romanesque Revival style, it was at first an unusual instance of a freight terminal being more visually striking than its corresponding passenger terminal. The station was a site for trains from the south, from Allentown via Wilkes-Barre and Jim Thorpe. Through trains (such as the Philadelphia Flyer (Scranton-Allentown-Philadelphia) and the Scranton Flyer, making the northbound trip, or connections were available at Allentown for Jersey City and Philadelphia. Service ended at some point between 1950 and 1954. When the railroad shut down its Pennsylvania operations in 1972, during bankruptcy proceedings, the terminal was closed by the Lehigh Valley Railroad, which took it over, and has remained unused since that time.

It was added to the National Register of Historic Places in 1979.

See also
Wilson Brothers & Company
List of stations on the Central Railroad of New Jersey

References

External links 

Railway stations in the United States opened in 1891
Railway stations on the National Register of Historic Places in Pennsylvania
Former Central Railroad of New Jersey stations
Romanesque Revival architecture in Pennsylvania
Buildings and structures in Scranton, Pennsylvania
National Register of Historic Places in Lackawanna County, Pennsylvania
Transportation buildings and structures in Lackawanna County, Pennsylvania
Former railway stations in Pennsylvania